Anguilla is an unincorporated community in Glynn County, in the U.S. state of Georgia.

History
The community was named after Anguilla, in recognition of that island's cotton industry.

References

Unincorporated communities in Glynn County, Georgia